Robert S. Molaro (June 29, 1950 – June 15, 2020) was an American politician. He served as a Democratic member of both houses of the Illinois General Assembly.

Biography
He graduated from Loyola University with a B.S. in business administration and received his J.D. from John Marshall Law School. He served as a delegate to the 1988 Democratic National Convention. In 1984, he was elected the Democratic Committeeman for Chicago's 12th ward. In 1993, he was elected to the Illinois Senate. He was later elected to the Illinois House of Representatives. Upon his retirement from the state legislature on December 4, 2008, Molaro was eligible for a public pension of about $64,000 annually based on the formula for Illinois lawmakers of 85% of their last salary. Chicago Alderman Edward M. Burke hired Molaro as an expert on pensions to write a 19-page white paper on Chicago's pension funds. Molaro worked as an aide to Burke for one month, earned $12,000, and nearly doubled his pension. On June 15, 2020, Molaro died of pancreatic cancer.

Electoral history
2002:    (D) Robert S. Molaro: 61%   (R) Randy Kantner: 39%

2004:    (D) Robert S. Molaro: 59%     (R) Martin J. Ryan: 41%

2006:    (D) Robert S. Molaro: 70%    (R) Charles Johnson: 30%

2008:      Did not seek re-election

References

External links 
Illinois General Assembly - Representative Robert S. Molaro (D) 21st District official IL House website
Bills Committees
Project Vote Smart - Representative Robert S. Molaro (IL) profile
Follow the Money - Robert S Molaro
2006 2004 2002 2000 1998 1996 campaign contributions
Illinois House Democrats - Robert S. Molaro profile

Democratic Party Illinois state senators
Democratic Party members of the Illinois House of Representatives
1950 births
2020 deaths
Loyola University Chicago alumni
John Marshall Law School (Chicago) alumni
Lawyers from Chicago
Politicians from Chicago
21st-century American politicians
Deaths from pancreatic cancer